Soul System is an Italian group who won the tenth season of the Italian version of the X Factor.

History 
Four of the band members have Ghanaian origins, but they were all born in Italy, in Verona and in Brescia. They met in local Ghanaian and evangelical communities and eventually decided to form a band. The opportunity came when they met at the recording studio of Joel Ainoo, one of the members. In the summer of 2016 they had a number of live performances. After that, the band participated to the selection of The X Factor: first refused, the judge Álvaro Soler brought them back after the band Jarvis had left the show. Soul System reached the final and finally won the competition. They presented the song "She's Like a Star".

Together with Sergio Sylvestre, the band performed Nino Ferrer's "La pelle nera" during the third evening of the Sanremo Music Festival 2017. At the beginning of July they released a new song called "Liquido", which contains a sample of "Narcotic" by the German band Liquido. Their first studio album titled Back to the Future was released in September 2017.

Discography

Studio albums

Extended plays

Singles

As featured artist 
 "Stammi bene (On My Mind)" with Deborah Iurato (2019)

References

Italian pop music groups
The X Factor winners
X Factor (Italian TV series) contestants
Musical groups from Lombardy
Musical groups from Veneto